The B-class submarines were a class of six vessels of the US L class built on licence at Karljohansvern naval shipyard in Horten, Norway from 1922 to 1929 and deployed by the Royal Norwegian Navy.

Boats

  (1922–1946) Escaped to the United Kingdom 8 June 1940.
  (1923–1940) Captured by the Germans at Fiskå on 11 April.
  (1923–1940) Scuttled in Alsvåg, Vesterålen 10 June 1940 by its own crew to prevent  capture by the Germans. Ordered to escape to the UK, but prevented by battery explosion.
  (1923–1940) Captured by the Germans at Filtvet on 10 April.
  (1929–1940) Captured by the Germans at Fiskå on 11 April.
  (1929–1940) Surrendered to German troops on 18 May under threat of bombing of the port of Florø.

See also
List of ship classes of the Second World War

References

Bibliography
 

Submarine classes